Nor Aresh, is a neighbourhood in the Erebuni District of the Armenian capital Yerevan.

References 

Populated places in Yerevan